Lee Jae-jung (born 2 August 1974) is a South Korean politician and lawyer.

She first became a member of National Assembly via proportional representation in the 2016 general election. She became widely known to the public through her legislative efforts to transform status of firefighters and paramedics to federal employees guaranteeing sufficient resources for fire service. She has taken several roles in her party such as a party spokesperson from August 2018 and deputy head of its think tank from September 2019.

In the 2020 general election, she defeated Shim Jae-chul, then floor leader of the main opposition party and five-term parliamentarian.

Electoral history

References 

1974 births
Living people
People from Daegu
20th-century South Korean lawyers
South Korean women lawyers
Minjoo Party of Korea politicians
Kyungpook National University alumni
Members of the National Assembly (South Korea)
21st-century South Korean women politicians
21st-century South Korean politicians
21st-century South Korean lawyers
Female members of the National Assembly (South Korea)